David Meyer (born 1947) is an English actor.

David Meyer may also refer to:

David E. Meyer (born 1943), educator and psychologist
David Meyer (ice hockey) (fl. 1928), Belgian ice hockey player
David J. Meyer, United States Air Force officer
David Janssen (David Harold Meyer, 1931–1980), American actor

See also
David Meyers (disambiguation)
David Mayer (disambiguation)
David Mair (disambiguation)